Muddy Creek is a stream in Daviess and DeKalb Counties in the U.S. state of Missouri. It is a tributary of the Grand River.

The stream flows south and then east passing one mile north of Santa Rosa as it enters Daviess County.

Muddy Creek most likely was named for its muddy waters.

See also
List of rivers of Missouri

References

Rivers of Daviess County, Missouri
Rivers of DeKalb County, Missouri
Rivers of Missouri